{{Infobox MLB yearly
| name = Toronto Blue Jays
| image = Ceremony (3431778679).jpg
| caption = Singing of the national anthem during the Opening Day ceremony
| season = 2009
| slogan = You Belong at the Game"
| misc =
| logo = Toronto Blue Jays.svg|
| current league = American League
| y1 =  1977
| division = East Division
| y2 =  1977
| Uniform logo = Al 2005 toronto 01a.gif
| ballpark = Rogers Centre
| y4 = 1989
| city = Toronto, Ontario
| y5 = 1977
| record         = 75–87 (.463)
| divisional place = 4th
| owners = Rogers; Paul Beeston (CEO)
| general managers = J. P. Ricciardi
| managers = Cito Gaston
| television = TSN, TSN2(Rod Black, Pat Tabler)Rogers Sportsnet(Jamie Campbell, Pat Tabler, Rance Mulliniks, Darrin Fletcher)
| radio = FAN 590(Jerry Howarth, Alan Ashby, Mike Wilner)
}}

The 2009 Toronto Blue Jays season was the franchise's 33rd in Major League Baseball, and the 20th full season of play at the Rogers Centre. The team was managed by Cito Gaston, who was hired by the team midway through the 2008 season. General manager J. P. Ricciardi was fired on the penultimate day of the season, as the team again failed to make the playoffs. He was replaced by Assistant General Manager Alex Anthopoulos.

The team started the season well, and was in first place in the American League East with a 27–14 record. The team was swept by the Red Sox at Fenway Park from May 19 to 21, the first of nine straight losses that ultimately led to a disappointing season with a record of 75–87, 28 games behind the division lead, and 20 games behind the wild card spot. It was the first time that Toronto had finished with a losing record since 2005, when they finished 80–82.

 Offseason 

 Front office reorganization 
Ted Rogers, the founder of Rogers Communications and the Blue Jays' owner, died at the age of 75 on December 2, 2008, at his home in Toronto. Rogers purchased the Blue Jays in 2000, hoping to lead the franchise to its first playoff berth since the club last won the World Series in 1993. The team continues to be owned and operated by Rogers Blue Jays Baseball Partnership, a division of Rogers Communications.

Prior to Rogers' death, the team named Paul Beeston as interim president of baseball operations and chief operating officer replacing retiring president Paul Godfrey. The first employee in Toronto Blue Jays history, Beeston served in the same capacity with the organization from 1989 to 1997. Soon after being introduced on October 14, 2008, Beeston began a significant reorganization of the baseball operations of the club. In the wake of the global financial crisis and the loss of advertising revenue, the team let go of several employees from its media division on December 2.

On January 21, 2009, assistant general manager Bart Given was also dismissed to keep "costs down" for the upcoming season according to the team.

Additions were made to the scouting department, including the hiring of pro scouts Roy Smith, Steve Springer and four others.

 Player transactions 
The most significant change from the 2008 team was the departure of pitcher A. J. Burnett, who filed for free agency and signed a contract with the New York Yankees. Shaun Marcum (elbow), Casey Janssen (shoulder) and Dustin McGowan (labrum) started the season on the disabled list. Janssen has since returned, Getting a loss in his season debut vs the Braves, which the Jays lost 4-3.

 Retentions 
For the twelfth consecutive season the organization avoided going to an arbitration hearing, re-signing the five arbitration eligible players on the team. The team and relievers Brandon League (one year/$640K), Jeremy Accardo (one year/$900K), Jason Frasor (one year/$1.45M), Brian Tallet (one year/$1.025M) and Shawn Camp (one year/$750K) along with infielder José Bautista (one year/$2.4M) all came to terms.

The team also picked up the club option held on catcher Rod Barajas.

 Departures 
On November 5, 2008, pitcher A. J. Burnett opted out of the remaining two years of his five-year contract, ending months of speculation that the starter was planning to leave Toronto. Burnett, who in 2008 led the team in strikeouts and won 18 games, went on to sign with the division rival New York Yankees on December 18.

None of the five major league free agents from the Blue Jays' 2008 roster were tendered contracts. Catcher Gregg Zaun ended his five-year tenure in Toronto and signed a one-year deal with the rival Baltimore Orioles. Outfielder Brad Wilkerson (Boston), relief pitcher John Parrish (Orioles), and infielder Héctor Luna (Los Angeles (NL)) all signed minor league contracts elsewhere, while outfielder Kevin Mench signed a one-year deal with the Hanshin Tigers of Japan's Nippon League.

Minor league pitching prospect Jean Machi, who had been on the forty-man roster, was also released by the club in November.
Another major departure, third baseman Scott Rolen, was traded to the Cincinnati Reds for personal reasons.

 Arrivals 
The Blue Jays, faced with financial hardships, the fall of the Canadian dollar against the American dollar and a smaller budget, did not opt to make any major impact moves. Towards the end of spring training, they did however sign Kevin Millar to a one-year deal. Millar is known as a solid player to have in the clubhouse and would find time playing the DH and utility infield.
However, with the trade of Scott Rolen to the Cincinnati Reds, the Blue Jays welcomed infielder Edwin Encarnación, relief pitcher Josh Roenicke and a minor league pitching prospect.

 Pitchers 
Two starters recovering from major shoulder surgery would have an opportunity to claim rotation slots with the club coming out of spring training. Former All-Star starter Matt Clement, who spent an injury riddled 2008 season with St. Louis was signed on December 12. Left-handed starter Mike Maroth, who last pitched in the majors in 2007 with St. Louis, was inked to a minor league deal on December 30.

Two former first overall draft picks were also acquired by the club. 2002 top selection Bryan Bullington was claimed off waivers from Cleveland in October. The Jays also traded for 2004 number one choice Matt Bush in February. Bush had previously been in the Padres organisation.

The team imported fourteen-year Nippon League veteran Ken Takahashi from Japan. Toronto claimed southpaw Brian Burres (Baltimore), and reliever T. J. Beam (Pittsburgh) off waivers. The club also re-signed Dirk Hayhurst in February, days after releasing the former waiver claim.

 Position players 
Former silver slugging catcher Michael Barrett and infielder Kevin Millar were among the prominent additions to the team offensively. Barrett, who missed much of his 2008 season with the Padres due to a facial fracture, is a top candidate to be the Blue Jays backup catcher. Millar, who spent the previous three seasons with Baltimore and hit twenty home runs in 2008, will have an opportunity for a bench or platoon role with the Jays.

In January, the team signed outfielder Jason Lane (Boston) and infielder Brandon Fahey (Baltimore) to minor league deals. In December, the team inked catcher Raúl Chávez (Pittsburgh) and designated hitter Randy Ruiz (Minnesota). In October the club announced it signed former Orioles pitcher Adam Loewen and will attempt to convert him to a first baseman.

 Injuries 
Starter Shaun Marcum was lost for the 2009 season when he underwent Tommy John surgery in the fall of 2008. The right-hander went under the knife to repair ligaments in his pitching elbow, and is tentatively expected to be back for the Jays' 2010 spring training.

Pitcher Casey Janssen who missed all of 2008 due to shoulder problems was expected to compete for a rotation spot, but was put on the 15-day disabled list just before the season began. Starter Dustin McGowan who is recovering from right labrum surgery is expected to rejoin the club sometime in May.

On April 23, the Blue Jays placed starting pitcher Ricky Romero and closer B. J. Ryan on the 15-day disabled list. Romero was suffering from a right oblique strain, while Ryan was sent to see a specialist for a tight left trapezius muscle. Ryan has since returned, but not as the closer.

On June 9, it was announced that Jesse Litsch will undergo season-ending ligament replacement ("Tommy John") surgery.

 Broadcasts 
The Jays' flagship station for radio is The FAN 590, which has all 162 regular season games. Jerry Howarth and Alan Ashby will call all 162, with Mike Wilner being the third personality. Mike will also host the pregame and postgame show for each game, as long as there is time for it before/after. The Blue Jays' flagship TV station is Rogers Sportsnet, which is airing over 100 games in 2009 for the Jays. The two other stations are both in the TSN network, TSN and TSN2. TSN has coverage starting after they are done with NHL on TSN (during the Stanley Cup Finals, coverage usually starts). From May 19–21, the two Jays stations were occupied with hockey and TSN2 airs the Jays in TSN's place. With Sportsnet taking care of the annual Memorial Cup, and TSN covering the NHL conference finals, TSN2 was open, and took in at the time, the biggest series of the Jays' young season. Rod Black and Pat Tabler did not cover this series though, TSN2 broadcast NESN coverage. TSN2 had the September 13 game versus the Tigers and will air the Jays home closer versus the Mariners on September 27. Untelevised games can be seen on JaysVision on Rogers Cable (digital only). Otherwise, the viewer must subscribe to MLB Extra Innings, which gets the feed from the opposing team's station. MLB Extra Innings is available on satellite and digital cable.

 Regular season 

 Season summary 

The Jays began the year with a schedule that had them playing teams from the Central and the West divisions for 24 games in April. Adam Lind slugged out an opening day record 6 RBI, and the Jays pummeled the Tigers, giving Roy Halladay the win. They went on to win the first 6 series of the season, and finished April with a 15-9 record, tied with the Red Sox for first in the AL East.

The first game against the New York Yankees occurred on May 12, in a marquee matchup of Roy Halladay versus former teammate A. J. Burnett. Not only did the Jays win 8-2, but Halladay recorded his first complete game of the season, while giving Burnett his first loss on the year. The Jays drew a crowd of 43,737 fans. This was the first non-home opener Rogers Centre sell out since July 22 of the previous year against the Yankees, drawing a crowd of 50,014. However, the remaining two games of the 2009series were won by the Yankees, making this the first series lost by the Jays at home that season. They followed this with a series sweep of the Chicago White Sox, at which time the Jays had the best record (27-14) in the American League, but this was followed by a disastrous road trip to Boston, Atlanta and Baltimore during which the Jays lost 9 straight games, tying their longest away-game losing streak since a nine-game run in May 2007. This left the Jays at 27-23, behind Boston and the Yankees by 1.5 games. The Blue Jays then bounced back, taking two out of three from Boston, and had some more considerable successes, most notably a three-game road sweep of the Philadelphia Phillies. However, they never again held a playoff position, and gradually faded out of the picture: they were out of contention by the All-Star break, and were never able to mount any sort of charge reminiscent of 2008's 10-game winning streak to get back in the race.

Roy Halladay and Aaron Hill were named to the American League All-Star team. Halladay was the starting pitcher, and Hill started the game at second base.

 Firing of J. P. Ricciardi 

On October 3, the J. P. Ricciardi era ended in Toronto. When he took over in 2002, he guaranteed a playoff berth; the Jays never even came close to a playoff berth, never finishing better than 10 games behind the top of the division during Ricciardi's reign. After a promising start to 2009, the Jays faltered, and Ricciardi publicized the topic of a Roy Halladay trade, which many Jays fans disapproved. Allegedly, Ricciardi told Ken Rosenthal of Fox Sports a day before the firing, in which some Blue Jays players spoke critically about Cito Gaston. A day later, Paul Beeston reportedly found out about Ricciardi leaking the information to the media, and promptly fired him. Assistant GM Alex Anthopoulos took over immediately.

 Season standings 

 AL East 

 Detailed record 

 Vs. opponents 

 2009 draft picks SourceThe 2009 MLB Draft was held on June 9–11. The Blue Jays had a first round pick, along with one compensation pick. The Blue Jays also had two picks in the third round.

 * The Blue Jays received the 37th pick as compensation for loss of free agent A. J. Burnett

 Roster 

 Game log 

|- align="center" bgcolor="bbffbb"
| 1 || April 6 || Tigers || 12–5 || Halladay (1–0) || Verlander (0–1) || || 48,027 || 1–0 || 0
|- align="center" bgcolor="bbffbb"
| 2 || April 7 || Tigers || 5–4 || Ryan (1–0) || Lyon (0–1) || || 16,790 || 2–0 || +½
|- align="center" bgcolor="ffbbbb"
| 3 || April 8 || Tigers || 5–1 || Miner (1–0) || Litsch (0–1) || || 12,145 || 2–1 || ½
|- align="center" bgcolor="bbffbb"
| 4 || April 9 || Tigers || 6–2 || Romero (1–0) || Porcello (0–1) || || 15,297 || 3–1 || +½
|- align="center" bgcolor="bbffbb"
| 5 || April 10 || @ Indians || 13–7 || League (1–0) || Pérez (0–1) || || 42,473 || 4–1 || +½
|- align="center" bgcolor="bbffbb"
| 6 || April 11 || @ Indians || 5–4 || Halladay (2–0) || Lee (0–2) || Frasor (1) || 20,895 || 5–1 || +½
|- align="center" bgcolor="ffbbbb"
| 7 || April 12 || @ Indians || 8–4 || Reyes (1–0) || Purcey (0–1) || || 14,216 || 5–2 || +½
|- align="center" bgcolor="bbffbb"
| 8 || April 13 || @ Twins || 8–6 || Frasor (1–0) || Ayala (1–1) || Ryan (1) || 16,410 || 6–2 || +½
|- align="center" bgcolor="ffbbbb"
| 9 || April 14 || @ Twins || 3–2 (11) || Crain (1–0) || Carlson (0–1) || || 15,375 || 6–3 || ½
|- align="center" bgcolor="bbffbb"
| 10 || April 15 || @ Twins || 12–2 || Richmond (1–0) || Baker (0–1) || || 19,471 || 7–3 || +½
|- align="center" bgcolor="bbffbb"
| 11 || April 16 || @ Twins || 9–2 || Halladay (3–0) || Liriano (0–3) || || 15,169 || 8–3 || +1
|- align="center" bgcolor="ffbbbb"
| 12 || April 17 || Athletics || 8–5 || Bailey (2–0) || League (1–1) || Ziegler (3) || 18,272 || 8–4 || +1
|- align="center" bgcolor="bbffbb"
| 13 || April 18 || Athletics || 4–2 (12) || Frasor (2–0) || Giese (0–1) || || 21,698 || 9–4 || +2
|- align="center" bgcolor="bbffbb"
| 14 || April 19 || Athletics || 1–0 || Romero (2–0) || Braden (1–2) || Ryan (2) || 22,164 || 10–4 || +2½
|- align="center" bgcolor="ffbbbb"
| 15 || April 21 || Rangers || 5–4 || McCarthy (2–0) || Halladay (3–1) || Francisco (2) || 20,996 || 10–5 || +1½
|- align="center" bgcolor="bbffbb"
| 16 || April 22 || Rangers || 8–7 (11) || Frasor (3–0) || Wilson (0–2) || || 13,090 || 11–5 || +1½
|- align="center" bgcolor="bbffbb"
| 17 || April 23 || Rangers || 5–2 || Richmond (2–0) || Millwood (1–2) || Downs (1) || 15,487 || 12–5 || +2
|- align="center" bgcolor="bbffbb"
| 18 || April 24 || @ White Sox || 14–0 || Tallet (1–0) || Floyd (2–2) || || 27,103 || 13–5 || +2
|- align="center" bgcolor="ffbbbb"
| 19 || April 25 || @ White Sox || 10–2 || Buehrle (3–0) || Burres (0–1) || || 30,383 || 13–6 || +1
|- align="center" bgcolor="bbffbb"
| 20 || April 26 || @ White Sox || 4–3 || Halladay (4–1) || Linebrink (0–1) || Downs (2) || 31,459 || 14–6 || +1
|- align="center" bgcolor="ffbbbb"
| 21 || April 27 || @ Royals || 7–1 || Bannister (2–0) || Purcey (0–2) || || 9,685 || 14–7 || 0
|- align="center" bgcolor="bbffbb"
| 22 || April 28 || @ Royals || 8–1 || Richmond (3–0) || Meche (1–2) || || 15,191 || 15–7 || +1
|- align="center" bgcolor="ffbbbb"
| 23 || April 29 || @ Royals || 11–3 || Greinke (5–0) || Tallet (1–1) || || 10,619 || 15–8 || 0
|- align="center" bgcolor="ffbbbb"
| 24 || April 30 || @ Royals || 8–6 || Davies (2–1) || Burres (0–2) || || 11,896 || 15–9 || 0
|- align="center"

|- align="center" bgcolor="bbffbb"
| 25 || May 1 || Orioles || 8–4 || Halladay (5–1) || Hendrickson (1–4) || || 20,020 || 16–9 || +1
|- align="center" bgcolor="bbffbb"
| 26 || May 2 || Orioles || 5–4 (11) || Frasor (4–0) || Bass (0–1) || || 18,331 || 17–9 || +1
|- align="center" bgcolor="bbffbb"
| 27 || May 3 || Orioles || 4–3 || Richmond (4–0) || Guthrie (2–2) || Downs (3) || 20,418 || 18–9 || +2
|- align="center" bgcolor="ffbbbb"
| 28 || May 4 || Indians || 9–7 (12) || Betancourt (1–1) || Camp (0–1) || Lewis (1) || 15,295 || 18–10 || +1
|- align="center" bgcolor="bbffbb"
| 29 || May 5 || Indians || 10–6|| Wolfe (1–0) || Chulk (0–1) || || 22,005 || 19–10 || +1
|- align="center" bgcolor="bbffbb"
| 30 || May 6 || @ Angels || 13–1 || Halladay (6–1) || Ortega (0–2) || || 41,123 || 20–10 || +2
|- align="center" bgcolor="ffbbbb"
| 31 || May 7 || @ Angels || 6–1 || Weaver (3–1) || Ray (0–1) || || 41,007 || 20–11 || +1
|- align="center" bgcolor="ffbbbb"
| 32 || May 8 || @ Athletics || 5–3 || Wuertz (2–1) || Richmond (4–1) || Bailey (1) || 14,103 || 20–12 || 0
|- align="center" bgcolor="bbffbb"
| 33 || May 9 || @ Athletics || 6–4 || Tallet (2–1) || Gallagher (1–1) || || 15,817 || 21–12 || +1
|- align="center" bgcolor="bbffbb"
| 34 || May 10 || @ Athletics || 5–0 || Cecil (1–0) || Braden (3–4) || || 15,126 || 22–12 || +1
|- align="center" bgcolor="bbffbb"
| 35 || May 12 || Yankees || 5–1 || Halladay (7–1) || Burnett (2–1) || || 43,737 || 23–12 || +1
|- align="center" bgcolor="ffbbbb"
| 36 || May 13 || Yankees || 8–2 || Pettitte (3–1) || Richmond (4–2) || || 20,164 || 23–13 || +1
|- align="center" bgcolor="ffbbbb"
| 37 || May 14 || Yankees || 3–2 || Sabathia (3–3) || Carlson (0–2) || Rivera (7) || 22,667 || 23–14 || +1
|- align="center" bgcolor="bbffbb"
| 38 || May 15 || White Sox || 8–3 || Cecil (2–0) || Danks (2–3) || || 17,241 || 24–14 || +2
|- align="center" bgcolor="bbffbb"
| 39 || May 16 || White Sox || 2–1 || Ray (1–1) || Linebrink (1–2) || Downs (4) || 21,879 || 25–14 || +2
|- align="center" bgcolor="bbffbb"
| 40 || May 17 || White Sox || 8–2 || Halladay (8–1) || Floyd (2–4) || || 37,137 || 26–14 || +3
|- align="center" bgcolor="bbffbb"
| 41 || May 18 || White Sox || 3–2 || Carlson (1–2) || Dotel (1–1) || Downs (5) || 24,206 || 27–14 || +3½
|- align="center" bgcolor="ffbbbb"
| 42 || May 19 || @ Red Sox || 2–1 || Wakefield (5–2) || Tallet (2–2) || Papelbon (11) || 37,830 || 27–15 || +2½
|- align="center" bgcolor="ffbbbb"
| 43 || May 20 || @ Red Sox || 8–3 || Penny (4–1) || Cecil (2–1) || || 38,099 || 27–16 || +1½
|- align="center" bgcolor="ffbbbb"
| 44 || May 21 || @ Red Sox || 5–1 || Lester (3–4) || Ray (1–2)|| || 38,347 || 27–17 || +½
|- align="center" bgcolor="ffbbbb"
| 45 || May 22 || @ Braves || 1–0 || Kawakami (3–5) || Carlson (1–3) || González (7) || 21,533 || 27–18 || +½
|- align="center" bgcolor="ffbbbb"
| 46 || May 23 || @ Braves || 4–3 || Lowe (6–2) || Janssen (0–1) || Soriano (4) || 27,377 || 27–19 || +½
|- align="center" bgcolor="ffbbbb"
| 47 || May 24 || @ Braves || 10–2 || Bennett (2–1) || Camp (0–2) || || 23,971 || 27–20 || ½
|- align="center" bgcolor="ffbbbb"
| 48 || May 25 || @ Orioles || 4–1 || Guthrie (4–4) || Tallet (2–3) || Sherrill (10) || 24,904 || 27–21 || 1½
|- align="center" bgcolor="ffbbbb"
| 49 || May 26 || @ Orioles || 7–2 || Berken (1–0) || Romero (2–1) || || 10,130 || 27–22 || 1½
|- align="center" bgcolor="ffbbbb"
| 50 || May 27 || @ Orioles || 12–10 (11) || Báez (4–1) || Wolfe (1–1) || || 13,713 || 27–23 || 1½
|- align="center" bgcolor="bbffbb"
| 51 || May 29 || Red Sox || 6–3 || Janssen (1–1) || Wakefield (6–3)|| Downs (6) || 32,026 || 28–23 || 1½
|- align="center" bgcolor="bbffbb"
| 52 || May 30 || Red Sox || 5–3 || Tallet (3–3) || Ramírez (4–2) || Downs (7) || 35,484 || 29–23 || 1½
|- align="center" bgcolor="ffbbbb"
| 53 || May 31 || Red Sox || 8–2 || Lester (4–5) || Romero (2–2) || || 30,496 || 29–24 || 1½
|-

|- align="center" bgcolor="bbffbb"
| 54 || June 2 || Angels || 6–4 || Halladay (9–1) || Saunders (6–4) || || 26,809 || 30–24 || 2
|- align="center" bgcolor="ffbbbb"
| 55 || June 3 || Angels || 8–1 || Weaver (5–2) || Janssen (1–2) || || 17,127 || 30–25 || 2
|- align="center" bgcolor="ffbbbb"
| 56 || June 4 || Angels || 6–5 || Speier (2–1) || League (1–2) || || 31,163 || 30–26 || 3
|- align="center" bgcolor="bbffbb"
| 57 || June 5 || Royals || 9–3 || Romero (3–2) || Greinke (8–2) || || 15,435 || 31–26 || 2½
|- align="center" bgcolor="ffbbbb"
| 58 || June 6 || Royals || 6–2 || Hochevar (1–2) || Richmond (4–3) || || 16,552 || 31–27 || 3
|- align="center" bgcolor="bbffbb"
| 59 || June 7 || Royals || 4–0 || Halladay (10–1)|| Davies (2–6) || || 21,071 || 32–27 || 2½
|- align="center" bgcolor="bbffbb"
| 60 || June 8 || @ Rangers || 6–3 || Janssen (2–2) || Feldman (5–1) || Downs (8) || 17,856 || 33–27 || 2½
|- align="center" bgcolor="bbffbb"
| 61 || June 9 || @ Rangers || 9–0 || Tallet (4–3) || Mathis (0–1) || || 17,535 || 34–27 || 1½
|- align="center" bgcolor="bbbbbb"
|–|| June 10 || @ Rangers || colspan=6|Postponed (rain) Rescheduled for September 1|| 2
|- align="center" bgcolor="ffbbbb"
| 62 || June 11 || @ Rangers || 1–0 || Millwood (6–4) || Romero (3–3) || Wilson (6) || 16,073 || 34–28|| 3
|- align="center" bgcolor="ffbbbb"
| 63 || June 12 || Marlins || 7–3 || Meyer (1–0) || League (1–3) || || 17,922 || 34–29 || 4
|- align="center" bgcolor="ffbbbb"
| 64 || June 13 || Marlins || 6–5 || West (2–1) || Janssen (2–3) || Lindstrom (12) || 20,634 || 34–30 || 5
|- align="center" bgcolor="ffbbbb"
| 65 || June 14 || Marlins || 11–3 || Johnson (6–1) || Tallet (4–4)|| || 20,985 || 34–31 || 5
|- align="center" bgcolor="bbffbb"
| 66 || June 16 || @ Phillies || 8–3 (10) || Downs (1–0) || Condrey (4–2) || || 44,958 || 35–31 || 5
|- align="center" bgcolor="bbffbb"
| 67 || June 17 || @ Phillies || 7–1 || Richmond (5–3) || Moyer (4–6) || || 42,091 || 36–31 || 5
|- align="center" bgcolor="bbffbb"
| 68 || June 18 || @ Phillies || 8–7 || Frasor (5–0) || Madson (2–2) || Accardo (1) || 44,036 || 37–31 || 4
|- align="center" bgcolor="ffbbbb"
| 69 || June 19 || @ Nationals || 2–1 (11) || Colomé (1–0) || Frasor (5–1) || || 20,860 || 37–32 || 4
|- align="center" bgcolor="ffbbbb"
| 70 || June 20 || @ Nationals || 5–3 (12) || Tavárez (3–4) || Richmond (5–4) || || 22,142 || 37–33 || 5
|- align="center" bgcolor="bbffbb"
| 71 || June 21 || @ Nationals || 9–4 || Romero (4–3) || Martis (5–2) || || 26,610 || 38–33 || 5
|- align="center" bgcolor="bbffbb"
| 72 || June 23 || Reds || 7–5 || Tallet (5–4) || Owings (4–8) || Frasor (2) || 30,351 || 39–33 ||5
|- align="center" bgcolor="bbffbb"
| 73 || June 24 || Reds || 8–2 || Richmond (6–4) || Arroyo (8–6) || || 15,409 || 40–33 || 5
|- align="center" bgcolor="ffbbbb"
| 74 || June 25 || Reds || 7–5 || Cueto (6–4) || Camp (0–3) || Cordero (18) || 15,329 || 40–34 || 5
|- align="center" bgcolor="bbffbb"
| 75 || June 26 || Phillies || 6–1 || Romero (5–3) || Hamels (4–4) || || 21,331 || 41–34 || 5
|- align="center" bgcolor="ffbbbb"
| 76 || June 27 || Phillies || 10–0 || Happ (5–0)|| Mills (0–1) || || 28,805 || 41–35 || 6
|- align="center" bgcolor="ffbbbb"
| 77 || June 28 || Phillies || 5–4 || Moyer (6–6) || Tallet (5–5) || Lidge (14) || 36,378 || 41–36 || 6
|- align="center" bgcolor="ffbbbb"
| 78 || June 29 || Rays || 4–1 || Niemann (7–4) || Halladay (10–2) || Choate (4) || 15,665 || 41–37 || 7
|- align="center" bgcolor="ffbbbb"
| 79 || June 30 || Rays || 4–1 || Garza (6–5) || Richmond (6–5) || Howell (6) || 15,477 || 41–38 || 7
|-

|- align="center" bgcolor="bbffbb"
| 80 || July 1 || Rays || 5–0 || Romero (6–3) || Shields (6–6) || || 30,533 || 42–38 || 7
|- align="center" bgcolor="ffbbbb"
| 81 || July 3 || @ Yankees || 4–2|| Burnett (7–4) || Tallet (5–6)|| Rivera (21)|| 46,308|| 42–39||7
|- align="center" bgcolor="ffbbbb"
| 82 || July 4 || @ Yankees || 6–5  (12) || Tomko (1–2)|| Camp (0–4)|| || 46,620|| 42–40||7
|- align="center" bgcolor="ffbbbb"
| 83 || July 5 || @ Yankees || 10–8 || Albaladejo (3–1) || Ryan (1–1)|| Aceves (1) || 46,320 || 42–41 ||8
|- align="center" bgcolor="bbffbb"
| 84 || July 6 || @ Yankees || 7–6 || Romero (7–3) || Pettitte (8–4) || Frasor (3) || 46,450 || 43–41 || 7
|- align="center" bgcolor="ffbbbb"
| 85 || July 7 || @ Rays || 3–1  (11) || Wheeler (3–1) || League (1–4) || || 15,244 || 43–42 || 8
|- align="center" bgcolor="ffbbbb"
| 86 || July 8 || @ Rays || 10–9 || Howell (5–2) || Frasor (5–2) || || 15,252 || 43–43 || 9
|- align="center" bgcolor="ffbbbb"
| 87 || July 9 || @ Rays || 3–2 || Price (3–3) || Halladay (10–3) || Wheeler (1) || 25,749 || 43–44 || 9
|- align="center" bgcolor="bbffbb"
| 88 || July 10 || @ Orioles || 2–0 || Cecil (3–1) || Berken (1–6) || Downs (9) || 30,574 || 44–44 || 9
|- align="center" bgcolor="ffbbbb"
| 89 || July 11 || @ Orioles || 4–3  (12) || Hendrickson (5–4) || Carlson (1–4) || || 28,281 || 44–45 || 10
|- align="center" bgcolor="ffbbbb"
| 90 || July 12 || @ Orioles || 4–2 || Bergesen (6–3) || Rzepczynski (0–1) || Sherrill (20) || 21,621 || 44–46 || 11
|- align="center" bgcolor="ffbbbb"
| 91 || July 17 || Red Sox || 4–1 || Buchholz (1–0) || Romero (7–4) || Papelbon (24) || 32,928 || 44–47 || 12
|- align="center" bgcolor="bbffbb"
| 92 || July 18 || Red Sox || 6–2 || Rzepczynski (1–1) || Penny (6–4) || || 36,926 || 45–47 || 11
|- align="center" bgcolor="bbffbb"
| 93 || July 19 || Red Sox || 3–1 || Halladay (11–3) || Lester (8–7) || || 36,534 || 46–47 || 10
|- align="center" bgcolor="ffbbbb"
| 94 || July 21 || Indians || 2–1 || Lee (6–9) || Downs(1–1) || || 18,330 || 46–48 || 10½
|- align="center" bgcolor="bbffbb"
| 95 || July 22 || Indians || 10–6 || Romero (8–4) || Pavano (8–8) || || 18,375 || 47–48 || 10½
|- align="center" bgcolor="ffbbbb"
| 96 || July 23 || Indians || 5–4 || Huff (5–4) || Rzepczynski (1–2)|| Wood (13) || 32,061 || 47–49 || 11½
|- align="center" bgcolor="ffbbbb"
| 97 || July 24 || Rays || 4–2 || Garza (7–7) || Downs (1–2)|| Howell (11) || 24,161|| 47–50 || 12½
|- align="center" bgcolor="ffbbbb"
| 98 || July 25 || Rays || 10–9  (12) || Howell (6–2) || Camp (0–5) || Nelson (3) || 26,527 || 47–51 || 12½
|- align="center" bgcolor="bbffbb"
| 99 || July 26 || Rays || 5–1 || Cecil (4–1) || Niemann (9–5)|| || 30,610 || 48–51 || 12½
|- align="center" bgcolor="bbffbb"
| 100 || July 27 || @ Mariners || 11–4 || Romero (9–4) || Hernández (11–4) || || 28,696 || 49–51 || 12½
|- align="center" bgcolor="ffbbbb"
| 101 || July 28 || @ Mariners || 4–3 || Aardsma (3–3) || Downs (1–3) || || 26,148 || 49–52 || 12½
|- align="center" bgcolor="ffbbbb"
| 102 || July 29 || @ Mariners || 3–2 || Rowland-Smith (1–1)|| Halladay (11–4) || Aardsma (25) || 32,649 || 49–53 || 13½
|- align="center" bgcolor="ffbbbb"
| 103 || July 31 || @ Athletics || 8–5 || Braden (8–9) || Richmond (6–6)|| Bailey (14) || 12,151 || 49–54 || 13
|-

|- align="center" bgcolor="bbffbb"
| 104 || August 1 || @ Athletics || 6–5 || Cecil (5–1) || Cahill (6–10) || Frasor (4) || 35,067 || 50–54 || 12
|- align="center" bgcolor="bbffbb"
| 105 || August 2 || @ Athletics || 7–2 || Romero (10–4) || Mazzaro (2–8) || || 13,070 || 51–54 || 12
|- align="center" bgcolor="ffbbbb"
| 106 || August 4 || Yankees || 5–3 || Pettitte (9–6) || Halladay (11–5) || || 33,669 || 51–55 || 13
|- align="center" bgcolor="ffbbbb"
| 107 || August 5 || Yankees || 8–4 || Aceves (7–1) || Rzepczynski (1–3) || || 31,402 || 51–56 || 14
|- align="center" bgcolor="ffbbbb"
| 108 || August 7 || Orioles || 7–5 || Berken (2–9) || Romero (10–5) || Johnson (3) || 30,795 || 51–57 || 15½
|- align="center" bgcolor="bbffbb"
| 109 || August 8 || Orioles || 3–2  (10) || Frasor (6–2)|| Báez (4–6) || || 28,613 || 52–57 || 16½
|- align="center" bgcolor="bbffbb"
| 110 || August 9 || Orioles || 7–3 || Halladay (12–5) || Matusz (1–1) || || 27,464 || 53–57 || 15½
|- align="center" bgcolor="bbffbb"
| 111 || August 10 || @ Yankees || 5–4 || Camp (1–5) || Mitre (1–1)|| Frasor (5) || 46,376|| 54–57 || 14½
|- align="center" bgcolor="ffbbbb"
| 112 || August 11 || @ Yankees || 7–5 || Robertson (2–1)|| Carlson (1–5) || Rivera (33)|| 46,523 || 54–58 || 15½
|- align="center" bgcolor="ffbbbb"
| 113 || August 12 || @ Yankees || 4–3 || Gaudin (5–10) || Camp (1–6) || || 47,113 || 54–59 || 16½
|- align="center" bgcolor="bbffbb"
| 114 || August 14 || @ Rays || 5–2 || Halladay (13–5) || Shields (7–9) || Frasor (6) || 21,522 || 55–59 || 17
|- align="center" bgcolor="ffbbbb"
| 115 || August 15 || @ Rays || 8–3 || Kazmir (7–7) || Tallet (5–7) || || 29,632 || 55–60 || 18
|- align="center" bgcolor="ffbbbb"
| 116 || August 16 || @ Rays || 5–2 || Wheeler (4–3)|| League (1–5) || || 24,625 || 55–61 || 18½
|- align="center" bgcolor="ffbbbb"
| 117 || August 18 || Red Sox || 10–9 || Okajima (4–0) || Janssen (2–4) || Papelbon (29) || 25,472|| 55–62 || 18½
|- align="center" bgcolor="ffbbbb"
| 118 || August 19 || Red Sox || 6–1 || Buchholz (2–3) || Halladay (13–6) || || 25,925 || 55–63 || 19½
|- align="center" bgcolor="ffbbbb"
| 119 || August 20 || Red Sox || 8–1 || Lester (10–7) || Cecil (5–2) || || 22,817 || 55–64 || 20
|- align="center" bgcolor="bbffbb"
| 120 || August 21 || Angels || 5–4 || Rzepczynski (2–3) || O'Sullivan (3–2) || Janssen (1) || 15,993 || 56–64 || 20
|- align="center" bgcolor="ffbbbb"
| 121 || August 22 || Angels || 7–3 || Santana (7–6) || Richmond (6–7) || || 23,235 || 56–65 || 20
|- align="center" bgcolor="bbffbb"
| 122 || August 23 || Angels || 8–3 || Romero (11–5) || Bell (1–1) || || 23,935 || 57–65 || 20½
|- align="center" bgcolor="ffbbbb"
| 123 || August 24 || Rays || 12–7 || Niemann (12–5) || Halladay (13–7) || || 17,184 || 57–66 || 20½
|- align="center" bgcolor="ffbbbb"
| 124 || August 25 || Rays || 7–3 || Shields (8–10) || Cecil (5–3) || || 17,307 || 57–67 || 20½
|- align="center" bgcolor="bbffbb"
| 125 || August 26 || Rays || 3–2 || League (2–5) || Howell (6–4) || || 15,349 || 58–67 || 20½
|- align="center" bgcolor="ffbbbb"
| 126 || August 28 || @ Red Sox || 6–5 || Okajima (5–0) || Tallet (5–8) || Papelbon (31) || 37,844 || 58–68 || 21
|- align="center" bgcolor="ffbbbb"
| 127 || August 29 || @ Red Sox || 3–2 || Buchholz (3–3) || Romero (11–6) || Papelbon (32) || 37,452 || 58–69|| 22
|- align="center" bgcolor="ffbbbb"
| 128 || August 30 || @ Red Sox || 7–0 || Byrd (1–0) || Halladay (13–8) || || 37,560 || 58–70 || 23
|- align="center" bgcolor="bbffbb"
| 129 || August 31 || @ Rangers || 18–10 || Cecil (6–3) || Holland (7–9) || || 16,675 || 59–70 || 23
|-

|- align="center" bgcolor="ffbbbb"
| 130 || September 1 || @ Rangers || 5–2 || Nippert (5–2) || Rzepczynski (2–4) || Francisco (20) || || 59–71 || 24½
|- align="center" bgcolor="ffbbbb"
| 131 || September 1 || @ Rangers || 5–2 || McCarthy (6–2) || Tallet (5–9) || Francisco (21) || 17,203 || 59–72 || 24½
|- align="center" bgcolor="ffbbbb"
| 132 || September 2 || @ Rangers || 6–4 || Hunter (7–3) || Richmond (6–8) || Francisco (22) || 21,836 || 59–73 || 25½
|- align="center" bgcolor="ffbbbb"
| 133 || September 3 || Yankees || 10–5 || Aceves (10–1) || Romero (11–7)|| || 22,773 || 59–74 || 26½
|- align="center" bgcolor="bbffbb"
| 134 || September 4 || Yankees || 6–0 || Halladay (14–8) || Chamberlain (8–5) || || 22,179 || 60–74 || 25½
|- align="center" bgcolor="ffbbbb"
| 135 || September 5 || Yankees || 6–4 || Pettitte (13–6) || Cecil (6–4) || Hughes (3) || 31,295 || 60–75 || 26½
|- align="center" bgcolor="bbffbb"
| 136 || September 6 || Yankees || 14–8 || Tallet (6–9) || Mitre (3–2) || || 30,873 || 61–75 || 25½
|- align="center" bgcolor="ffbbbb"
| 137 || September 7 || Twins || 6–3 || Crain (5–4) || Richmond (6–9) || Nathan (37) || 13,153 || 61–76 || 27
|- align="center" bgcolor="bbffbb"
| 138 || September 8 || Twins || 6–3 || Romero (12–7) || Rauch (4–3) || Frasor (7) || 13,488 || 62–76|| 27
|- align="center" bgcolor="ffbbbb"
| 139 || September 9 || Twins || 4–1 || Pavano (12–11) || Halladay (14–9) || Nathan (38) || 11,159 || 62–77 || 28
|- align="center" bgcolor="bbffbb"
| 140 || September 10 || Twins || 3–2 || Cecil (7–4) || Baker (13–8) || Frasor (8) || 11,461 || 63–77 || 27½
|- align="center" bgcolor="bbffbb"
| 141 || September 11 || @ Tigers || 6–4 || Tallet (7–9) || Robertson (2–1) || Frasor (9) || 31,575 || 64–77 || 26½
|- align="center" bgcolor="bbffbb"
| 142 || September 12 || @ Tigers || 8–6 || League (3–5) || Rodney (2–4) || Frasor (10) || 36,142 || 65–77 || 25½
|- align="center" bgcolor="ffbbbb"
| 143 || September 13 || @ Tigers || 7–2 || Porcello (13–8) || Romero (12–8) || || 32,468 || 65–78 || 26½
|- align="center" bgcolor="ffbbbb"
| 144 || September 14 || @ Tigers || 6–5 (10) || Seay (6–3) || Wolfe (1–2) || || 24,375 || 65–79 || 27½
|- align="center" bgcolor="bbffbb"
| 145 || September 15 || @ Yankees || 10–4 || Halladay (15–9) || Mitre (3–3) || || 45,847 || 66–79 || 26½
|- align="center" bgcolor="ffbbbb"
| 146 || September 16 || @ Yankees || 5–4 || Rivera (3–2) || Frasor (6–3) || || 46,046 || 66–80 || 27½
|- align="center" bgcolor="ffbbbb"
| 147 || September 18 || @ Rays || 11–4 || Shields (10–11) || Richmond (6–10) || || 18,426 || 66–81 || 27½
|- align="center" bgcolor="ffbbbb"
| 148 || September 19 || @ Rays || 4–0 || Garza (8–10) || Romero (12–9) || || 22,705 || 66–82 || 28½
|- align="center" bgcolor="ffbbbb"
| 149 || September 20 || @ Rays || 3–1 || Price (9–7) || Halladay (15–10) || Howell (17) || 20,937 || 66–83 || 28½
|- align="center" bgcolor="bbffbb"
| 150 || September 21 || Orioles || 9–2 || Purcey (1–2) || Tillamn (2–4) || || 11,598 || 67–83 || 27½
|- align="center" bgcolor="bbffbb"
| 151 || September 22 || Orioles || 6–5 (11) || Camp (2–6) || Sarfate (0–1)|| || 11,869 || 68–83 || 27½
|- align="center" bgcolor="bbffbb"
| 152 || September 23 || Orioles || 7–3 || Richmond (7–10) || Guthrie (10–16) || || 13,743 || 69–83 || 27½
|- align="center" bgcolor="ffbbbb"
| 153 || September 24 || Mariners || 5–4 || Hernández (17–5) || Carlson (1–6) || Aardsma (36) || 15,306 || 69–84 || 28
|- align="center" bgcolor="bbffbb"
| 154 || September 25 || Mariners || 5–0 || Halladay (16–10) || Fister (2–4) || || 20,668 || 70–84 || 28
|- align="center" bgcolor="bbffbb"
| 155 || September 26 || Mariners || 5–4 (10) || Frasor (7–3) || Kelley (5–4) || || 29,783 || 71–84 || 28
|- align="center" bgcolor="bbffbb"
| 156 || September 27 || Mariners || 5–4 || Wolfe (2–2) || Rowland-Smith (4–4) || Camp (1) || 39,052 || 72–84 || 28
|- align="center" bgcolor="bbffbb"
| 157 || September 28 || @ Red Sox || 11–5 (7) || Richmond (8–10)|| Bowden (0–1) || || 37,591 || 73–84 || 28
|- align="center" bgcolor="bbffbb"
| 158 || September 29 || @ Red Sox || 8–7 || Romero (13–9) || Buchholz (7–4) || Frasor (11) || 37,618 || 74–84 || 28
|- align="center" bgcolor="bbffbb"
| 159 || September 30 || @ Red Sox || 12–0 || Halladay (17–10) || Wakefield (11–5) || || 37,246 || 75–84 || 27
|-

|- align="center" bgcolor="ffbbbb"
| 160 || October 2 || @ Orioles || 13–7 || Berken (6–12) || Purcey (1–3) || || 16,921 || 75–85 || 27
|- align="center" bgcolor="ffbbbb"
| 161 || October 3 || @ Orioles || 6–3 || Hendrickson (6–5) || Richmond (8–11) || Johnson (10) || 23,254 || 75–86 || 27
|- align="center" bgcolor="ffbbbb"
| 162 || October 4 || @ Orioles || 5–4 (11) || Albers (3–6) || League (3–6) || || 17,969 || 75–87 || 28
|-

 Player stats Note: Yellow background = Team leader Batting Note: G = Games played; AB = At Bats; R = Runs scored; H = Hits; 2B = Doubles; 3B = Triples; HR = Home runs; RBI = Runs batted in; AVG = Batting average; SB = Stolen bases 

 Pitching Note: W = Wins; L = Losses; ERA = Earned run average; G = Games pitched; GS = Games started; SV = Saves; IP = Innings pitched; H = Hits allowed; R = Runs allowed; ER = Earned runs allowed; BB = Walks allowed; K = Strikeouts''

Honours and awards 
All-Star Game
 Aaron Hill – 2B (starter)
 Roy Halladay – P (starter)

Awards
 Aaron Hill – AL Comeback Player of the Year Award
 Aaron Hill – Silver Slugger Award -2B
 Adam Lind Silver Slugger Award -DH

Farm system

References

External links 

 2009 Toronto Blue Jays season at Baseball Reference
 2009 Toronto Blue Jays team page at www.baseball-almanac.com
 2009 Toronto Blue Jays official site

Toronto Blue Jays seasons
Toronto Blue Jays season
2009 in Canadian sports
2009 in Toronto